Angharad Mason (born 14 May 1979) is a Welsh racing cyclist, sports injury specialist, chartered physiotherapist and acupuncturist from Bridgend, Wales. Mason represented Wales in the women's road race at the 2010 Commonwealth Games in Delhi.

Mason attended Ysgol Gyfun Llanhari before gaining a BSc Hons from the University of Salford in 2001, and spent ten years working as a physiotherapist. A keen athlete, Mason had already gained a karate black belt, run nine marathons and completed two triathlons before specialising in cycling.

Palmarès

2009
2nd Welsh National Road Race Championships

2011
3rd Welsh National Road Race Championships

References

1979 births
Living people
Welsh female cyclists
Cyclists at the 2010 Commonwealth Games
Commonwealth Games competitors for Wales
Sportspeople from Bridgend